House to House: A Soldier's Memoir is a 2007 memoir by Iraq War veteran and Medal of Honor recipient David Bellavia.

The secondary author is John R. Bruning, who also helped write the war memoir Outlaw Platoon (2012).

Summary
House to House is an autobiography about the actions of Staff Sergeant David Bellavia during the second Battle of Fallujah. The book was released in 2007 and goes in-depth to describe the conditions of battle and the feelings that Bellavia experiences during the battle.

Reviews
"HOUSE TO HOUSE: An Epic Memoir of War." Kirkus Reviews 75.13 (July 2007): 640–640.
"House to House: An Epic Memoir of War." Publishers Weekly 254.29 (23 July 2007): 61–61.
Roberts, James C. "Iraq Veteran Details Horror and Heroism in Fallujah." Human Events 63.32 (24 Sep. 2007): 19–19. 
Douglas, Clint. "A Knife Under the Collarbone." Washington Monthly 39.9 (Sep. 2007): 55–57.

References

Iraq War memoirs
2007 non-fiction books